Bianca Andreescu and Charlotte Robillard-Millette were the defending champions, but decided not to participate this year.

Hiroko Kuwata and Valeria Savinykh won the title, defeating Kimberly Birrell and Emily Webley-Smith 4–6, 6–3, [10–5] in the final.

Seeds

Draw

References
Main Draw

Challenger Banque Nationale de Gatineau
Challenger de Gatineau